Damavand (also romanized as Damāvand, Damāwand and Demāvend; also known as Qasabehe Damāwand) is a city in the Central District of Damavand County, Tehran province, Iran, and serves as capital of the county. At the 2006 census, its population was 36,433 in 10,279 households. The following census in 2011 counted 37,315 people in 11,455 households. The latest census in 2016 showed a population of 48,380 people in 15,267 households.

Damavand is an ancient and historic city. The name Damavand appears in Sassanid texts (as Dunbawand), and Parthian remains have been found there. The city fell to Arab Muslim invaders in 651 CE. It is close to Iran's tallest peak Mount Damavand, which Ferdowsi mentions abundantly in the Shahnameh.
The city has relatively cool weather year-round.

Climate
Damavand has a cold semi-arid climate and is classified as BSk by the Köppen-Geiger System. The average annual temperature is 9.6°C in Damavand.

Economy
Damavand is an agricultural city and due to its streams, rivers, springs and temperate climate, it has numerous gardens and fields.  An important part of the city's economy is provided by the export of tree products.  Apples, pears, cherries, apricots, walnuts, apricots, tomatoes, wheat, potatoes, beans and cucumbers are some of the products of this city, some of which, like apples and pears, are famous and distinguished in terms of type.  In recent years, beekeeping has become one of the sources of income for the people of this city and Damavand honey competes with the best honey in Iran in terms of quality and constitutes a significant part of the city's exports. New style livestock has been developed in Damavand for several years and the obtained products are exported to Tehran in addition to meeting the needs of the region.

Transportation
Damavand can be reached by road  from Firuzkuh  via Gilavand  and from Haraz road, via Mosha.

Historical attractions
Damavand  contains 37 historical tombs (Imamzadeh), 27 castle ruins, 23 traditional houses of architectural significance, 18 traditional bath houses, 6 caves, 5 historical bridges, 3 historical mosques, and 3 caravanserais.

The main landmarks are the Friday  Mosque (15th century) and the  Sheikh Shebli Mausoleum and Tower, dating to the Seljuq era.

See also

 Shebeli Tower

References

External links

 Photo from Saha Air 707 at Airliners.net

Damavand County

Cities in Tehran Province

Populated places in Tehran Province

Populated places in Damavand County

Sasanian cities